The 1997 European Gymnastics Masters was the first edition of the European Gymnastics Masters tournament. The event would later have its name changed to European Team Gymnastics Championships. The competition formed teams of athletes representing different nations, combining events from men's and women's artistic gymnastics, as well as rhythmic gymnastics. The event was held from April 26 to April 27 in Paris, France. The tournament was organized by the European Union of Gymnastics.

Medalists

See also
 1999 European Gymnastics Masters
 2001 European Team Gymnastics Championships
 2003 European Team Gymnastics Championships
 European Gymnastics Championships

References

European Team Gymnastics Championships
International gymnastics competitions hosted by France
1997 in French sport
1997 in gymnastics